The National Judicial Examination was the unified legal examination of the People's Republic of China for legal professionals. It is replaced by the new created National Unified Legal Professional Qualification Examination since 2018.

Requirements 

Under amendments to the Judges Law, Prosecutors Law and the Lawyers Law in 2001, all participants of the NJE must have a university-level education, although not necessarily in law. The only exception was the 2002 NJE, where over 50% of participants only had a college-level law diploma. These people were allowed to sit the exam with special permission from the Ministry of Justice. Since then, new regulations require a law degree or three years of work experience in certain legal institutions. Another requirement is the person must have a record of good behaviour. Those caught cheating will be issued a ban for either two years or for life.

On March 30–31, 2002, China held the first NJE. Of the 360,000 participants, about one-third were staff members of the courts, procuratorates, police departments, and other workers in the field of law and justice. Only 7% of the participants passed the exam, but this result was considered reasonable in comparison with rates in judicial exams in Japan.

The number of participants decreased significantly in 2003 to 197,000 people, due to stricter education requirements. Nearly 89 percent of candidates received at least four years of university education, while 74 percent majored in law. The only exceptions are for remote counties lacking in advanced education facilities.

In 2004, residents of Hong Kong and Macau were permitted to sit for the exam for the first time. More than 400 in Hong Kong have applied.

Structure 

The NJE is a closed book exam mainly designed to test the legal knowledge of the applicant and their ability to join the legal profession. Questions are divided into four categories: 
theoretical legal science
applied legal science
provisions in current laws
legal practice and ethics

The AT0086 Chinese Educational website describes the examination as follows:

See also 
 All China Lawyers Association266

References

External links 
Measures for the Implementation of National Judicial Examination

Chinese law
Legal profession exams
2002 establishments in China